HMS Defence was a 74-gun  third-rate ship of the line of the Royal Navy, built by Israel Pownoll and launched on 31 March 1763 at Plymouth Dockyard. She was one of the most famous ships of the period, taking part in several of the most important naval battles of the French Revolutionary and Napoleonic wars. In 1811 she was wrecked off the coast of Jutland with the loss of almost her entire crew.

Career
During the American War of Independence, Defence served with the Channel Fleet, seeing action at the Battle of Cape St. Vincent in 1780. She was sent out to India in early 1782 as part of a squadron of five ships under Commodore Sir Richard Bickerton, arriving too late for the battles of that year. But in 1783 she took part in the last battle of the war, at Cuddalore. She returned to England at the end of 1785. She was then laid up during the years of peace until the outbreak of the French Revolutionary Wars.

After repairs, she was sent to the Mediterranean, joining Admiral William Hotham in time to take part in the Battle of Hyeres in July.

Defence was at Plymouth on 20 January 1795 and so shared in the proceeds of the detention of the Dutch naval vessels, East Indiamen, and other merchant vessels that were in port on the outbreak of war between Britain and the Netherlands.

In 1798 she returned to the Mediterranean under Captain John Peyton, taking part in the Battle of the Nile in August.

The British destroyed the French ship Therese (of 20 guns), a lugger (12 guns), two schooners (6 guns each) and a cutter (6 guns), of unknown names. The cutting out party also burned some 15 merchant vessels loaded with corn and supplies for the French fleet at Brest. However, in this enterprise, 92 officers and men out of the entire party of 192 men, fell prisoners to the French when their boats became stranded. Lord Nelson had contributed no men to the attacking force and so had no casualties.

In 1801, Defence sailed to the Baltic under Captain Lord Henry Paulet with Admiral Hyde Parker's fleet. She was present at the Battle of Copenhagen, but did not see action as she was part of the reserve under Parker.

Defence was one of the British ships in support of the 1809 Walcheren Campaign which was intended to capture Vlissingen (Flushing) and Antwerp in the Netherlands.

Loss

She ran aground on 24 December 1811 off the west coast of Jutland, Denmark. St George was jury-rigged and so Atkins refused to leave her without the admiral's permission. As a result, both were wrecked near Ringkøbing. Cressy did not ask for permission and so avoided wrecking.

Defence lost all but 14 of her crew of 597 men and boys, including her captain. St George too lost almost her entire crew, including the admiral. Most of the bodies that came ashore were buried in the sand dunes of Thorsminde, which have been known ever since as "Dead Mens Dunes". The Danish authorities quickly ordered Lieutenant Wigelsen to the area as Receiver of Wreck

Captain Atkins and his culpability for the loss
For two years commencing in 1792, he was 3rd lieutenant with Gower in  under Gower. John Barrow later claimed Atkins while on Lion was a navigator, "showing skill in lunar observations way beyond his years". He followed Gower onto  and was first lieutenant on Triumph from 1794. He was promoted captain in 1798; in 1801, he was promoted to captain; and thence to flag captain to Gower on Princess Royal. In 1805  was captained by him. In 1809, he commanded Defence in the Walcheren Expedition.

Accounting for blame for the loss is conflicted.  Some say he followed HMS St George onto the reef. As published by Brenton 3 Brenton (1837) Naval History of Great Britain the St George, bearing the flag of Rear-Admiral Robert Carthew Reynolds, ran ashore. Ostensibly, when told of this, Atkins asked whether the admiral had made the signal giving him leave to part company. Hearing a denial, Atkins said: “I will never desert my Admiral in the hour of danger and distress.” Defence ran aground and was overcome by a breaking sea. The breakup led to loss of 593 men, her full complement being 597. One of the survivors said that "At half-past twelve the captain told Mr. Baker he would not wear till the St. George did, but would stay by her."

On the other hand, the Annual Register (Vol 54), however, states that HMS Defence was the first ship to run aground and that HMS St George (flagship) immediately let go its anchor but that the ship swung around on her cable and also went aground as a result." This account was corroborated by an account printed in Gentleman's Magazine in 1812.  In the incident, "HMS St George was also destroyed, with the loss of 838 lives, including Reynolds." Given the fog of war and passage of time, this historical debate may never be conclusively resolved.

Atkins’ body was buried with full Military honours by the Danes.

Notes

Citations

References

External links
 
 Ships of the World (via archive.org)
 http://strandingsmuseet.dk
 Thorsminde on Danish Wikipedia

Ships of the line of the Royal Navy
Bellona-class ships of the line
Shipwrecks in the North Sea
Maritime incidents in 1811
Ships built in Plymouth, Devon
1763 ships